Juha Riihijärvi (born 15 December 1969 in Keminmaa, Finland) is a former professional ice hockey left winger who played his last season for Bolzano-Bozen Foxes in Italian Serie A.

Playing career

Career in Finland
Juha Riihijärvi played 4 seasons for Kärpät which is a team based in Oulu, Finland. After Kärpät, Riihijärvi played 2 seasons for JYP, where he won one bronze and one silver during his time with the Jyväskylä team.

Short visit to North America
Riihijärvi was drafted to National Hockey League by Edmonton Oilers in 1991 and was part of the Oilers organization for one season, 1993–94.

Riihijärvi did not get a chance in the NHL and settled playing for Oilers-affiliate, Cape Breton Oilers in the IHL for the whole season. Riihijärvi scored 25 points in 57 games for Cape Breton.

Return to Finland
After his short-lived NHL-attempt, Riihijärvi returned to Finland and played two seasons for Lukko. During his second season in Rauma, Riihijärvi won the goalscoring, pointscoring and MVP trophies while Lukko won Bronze, making it the third medal for Riihijärvi in SM-liiga.

Career in Sweden
After his good 1995/96 season in Lukko, Riihijärvi moved to Sweden and started to play for Malmö IF in the Elitserien. Riihijärvi would go on and establish himself as one of the franchise names for the Malmö team as he played a total of 470 games for the Redhawks in 7 seasons.

Visit to Switzerland
Riihijärvi played the 2004/05 season in Switzerland and his teams were HC Ambri-Piotta in the Nationalliga A and EHC Basel in Nationalliga B.

Final seasons in Sweden
Riihijärvi returned to Sweden after he played the season in Switzerland and played two more seasons for Malmö IF.

Riihijärvi and Malmö Redhawks gained promotion from HockeyAllsvenskan to Elitserien in 2006, but were again in Relegation series in 2007.

Move to Denmark
For 2007/08 season, Riihijärvi was contracted to Danish Oddset Ligaen-team Rødovre Mighty Bulls. After playing for Bolzano-Bozen Foxes during season 2009/2010, Rihijärvi retired from hockey.

Eliteprospects - Riihijärvi classified as retired

International career

Riihijärvi has played for Finnish national team in 133 games.

Riihijärvi's international highlight came in 1992 World Championship tournament where he was part of the team which won Finland's first World Championship-medal, a silver one.

Riihijärvi also played in 1993 and 1996 tournaments but Finland did not get any medals from them. Riihijärvi's latest international call-up's are from 2000, when he played in the Euro Hockey Tour.

Career statistics

Regular season and playoffs

International

References

1969 births
Living people
Bolzano HC players
Cape Breton Oilers players
Edmonton Oilers draft picks
Finnish expatriate ice hockey players in Austria
Finnish expatriate ice hockey players in Canada
Finnish expatriate ice hockey players in Denmark
Finnish expatriate ice hockey players in Sweden
Finnish expatriate ice hockey players in Switzerland
Finnish ice hockey left wingers
JYP Jyväskylä players
Lukko players
Malmö Redhawks players
New York Islanders scouts
Oulun Kärpät players
People from Keminmaa
Rødovre Mighty Bulls players
Vienna Capitals players
Sportspeople from Lapland (Finland)